"Living in the Plastic Age" (on some releases simply listed as "The Plastic Age") is a synthpop song written, performed and produced by the Buggles. It was released as the second single from their debut album The Age of Plastic on 14 January 1980.

The B-side of the single, "Island" was written as a 'Thank You' to their record company, Island Records.

Background and composition
The lyrics of "The Plastic Age" comment on the coldness of the culture of plastic technology in the 1970s. The song is 5 minutes and 8 seconds long, and is played at a tempo of 140 beats per minute. The song begins with sounds of telephones ringing, and brief, garbled yells, before a piano, synthpop bass and drumbeat start the song. There are also vocals that build up each chorus of the song.

Trevor Horn remembers about the song:

The 7" vinyl UK and Spanish version of the single included both the album version of the song on its A-side and the song "Island" on its B-side. In Spain, the song was released as "La Edad Del Plastico".  The single's French and Netherlands 7" vinyl release included an edit version of the song on their A-side, but the song "Island" was still on the B-side of both those releases. The Canadian release of the 7" vinyl included the edit of the song on the A-side, but, instead of "Island", the song "Johnny on the Monorail" was included on the B-side.

A 2011 Japanese re-issue of The Age of Plastic album features the longer version as on the original vinyl album and also includes the shorter "single version" as a bonus track.

Commercial performance
"Living in the Plastic Age" received chart performance on the UK Singles Chart, German Media Control Charts, the Dutch Top 100 and Top 40, in Wallonia and in France. The song was the forty-fifth best-selling song of 1980 in France, with sales of under 350,000 units.

Critical reception
Critical reactions to the songs have been positive.

Contemporary
In its 1980 review, Smash Hits listed the song as one of the best tracks on parent album "The Age of Plastic", alongside "Video Killed the Radio Star".

Retrospective
Don Ignacio, in a review of The Age of Plastic, gave the song an A+, and considered the song to be a highlight of the album. Krinein magazine wrote that songs from the album, "The Plastic Age", "Kid Dynamo", "Elstree" and "Johnny on the Monorail", were "equally effective in their melodies, rhythms and harmonies." Napster's Nicholas Baker said of "The Plastic Age" as one of the songs from the album that Trevor Horn's "considerable songwriting prowess" was evident in. In an AllMusic review of the album, the song was rated an AMG pick track.

Music video
The Buggles also created an unusual, futuristic and illusion-like music video for the song.  The video, directed by Russell Mulcahy, was only rarely shown on music channels but VH1 Classic occasionally airs the video. The music video for "Living in the Plastic Age" employed bright colours, harsh source lighting, much color keying, and provocative motifs (women in body paint portraying inanimate objects). Fine Print Magazine found the video to be unmemorable. It was also the 208th and second final video aired on MTV on its first day.

The band also recorded a mimed performance of the song for Top of the Pops, originally broadcast on 24 January 1980, and a second performance 2 weeks later.

Legacy
Will Harris of PopMatters said, in a 2003 review of Supertramp's album Breakfast in America, that the song "Living in the Plastic Age” might've had a keyboard bit cribbed from "Fool's Overture".

In 2004, the Buggles reunited (including Debi Doss, Linda Allen and Bruce Wooley) at Wembley Arena to perform "Video Killed the Radio Star" and "The Plastic Age" in front of Prince Charles, Prince of Wales as part of a Prince's Trust charity concert celebrating Horn's career as a producer.

French extreme metal band Carnival in Coal covered the song for their 2005 album Collection Prestige.

The song was performed at a September 2010 Buggles reunion performance, billed as "The Lost Gig", that took place at Ladbroke Grove's Supperclub, Notting Hill, London. It was a fund raiser with all earnings going to the Royal Hospital for Neuro-disability. With the exception of "The Plastic Age" and "Video Killed the Radio Star", "The Lost Gig" saw the first live performances of all songs from The Age of Plastic.

Charts

References

External links

1979 songs
1980 singles
The Buggles songs
Songs written by Geoff Downes
Songs written by Trevor Horn
Music videos directed by Russell Mulcahy
Island Records singles